was a senior retainer under the Chōsokabe clan during the latter years of the Sengoku period of Feudal Japan. He was also known as Kuwana Kazutaka (桑名一孝).

Samurai
1615 deaths
1551 births